Anne Nunes is a United States lawn bowls international.

Bowls career

World Championship
Nunes competed at the 2016 World Outdoor Bowls Championship in Christchurch and four years later in 2020 was selected for the 2020 World Outdoor Bowls Championship in Australia.

Asia Pacific
Nunes won a pairs bronze medal at the 2001 Asia Pacific Bowls Championships, 14 years later she won a second medal at the Championships winning a fours silver medal in Christchurch, New Zealand.

References

Living people
American female bowls players
Year of birth missing (living people)
21st-century American women